Ernest Richard Toop  (3 October 1895 – 14 November 1976) was a New Zealand politician and businessman.

Biography

Early life
Ernest Richard Toop was born in 1895. He became a merchant in Wellington starting his own company, becoming the managing director of the firm of Toop and Neilson, Ltd. He was the president of the Island Bay branch of the Returned Services' Association.

Political career
Toop stood as the National Party's candidate for the seat of Wellington South in the 1943 general election. He came runner-up to Labour's Robert McKeen. Toop was first elected to the Wellington City Council in 1944 on the ticket of the right-leaning Citizens' Association. He would remain a councillor until 1956. He served as the Deputy Mayor from 1953 to 1956 under Robert Macalister. In 1956 Toop was elected to the Wellington Harbour Board. He served on the board for the next 18 years including 5 years as the chair from 1961 to 1966.

In 1953, Toop was awarded the Queen Elizabeth II Coronation Medal.

In 1956 Toop became embroiled in a selection controversy. Under the impression that incumbent mayor Robert Macalister was not intending to seek a third term as mayor, Toop applied to gain nomination as the Citizens' mayoral candidate. As the only applicant he was successful. However, Macalister had intended to run again and thought that he, as the incumbent, held automatic nomination. Undeterred, Macalister ran for mayor again in 1956 as an Independent which split the Citizens' vote enabling Labour's Frank Kitts to win the mayoralty. Toop ran for mayor again in 1959 in a two-horse race against Kitts, but was again unsuccessful.

Later life and death
In the 1965 New Year Honours, Toop was appointed a Commander of the Order of the British Empire, for services to local government. He died in 1976, and was survived by his second wife.

Notes

References

1895 births
1976 deaths
Deputy mayors of Wellington
20th-century New Zealand businesspeople
Wellington City Councillors
Wellington Harbour Board members
New Zealand National Party politicians
Unsuccessful candidates in the 1943 New Zealand general election
New Zealand Commanders of the Order of the British Empire
New Zealand justices of the peace
People from Swinton, Greater Manchester
English emigrants to New Zealand